Kuppiyawatta Bodhananda Thera is the founder of Mithuru Mithuro Movement in Sri Lanka. It is a centre for drug rehabilitation and human values development.

Bodhananda was presented with Nalanda Keerthi Sri award in 2009 by his alma Marta Nalanda College, Colombo.

He was educated at Nalanda College Colombo.

References

 

 

Sri Lankan Buddhist monks
Alumni of Nalanda College, Colombo
Living people
Sri Lankan Theravada Buddhists
Year of birth missing (living people)